Élie Brousse (28 August 1921 – 2 July 2019) was a French rugby league player for Roanne, Marseille and Lyon Villeurbanne in the French rugby league championship competition.

Brousse featured in the 1951 French rugby league tour of Australia and New Zealand, Les Chanticleers first such tour, during which they lost only 4 of their 28 games.

References

1921 births
2019 deaths
French rugby league players
France national rugby league team players
Rugby league second-rows
RC Roanne XIII players
Marseille XIII players
Lyon Villeurbanne XIII players